Ismail Youssef Awadallah Mohamed (born 28 June 1964 in Giza) is a former Egyptian football player. He is currently the assistant manager of the Egyptian Premier League giants; Zamalek. Ismail is the youngest brother of two football players; El Sayed and Ibrahim.

Playing career

Zamalek
Ismail played for Zamalek from 1984 through 1997. Youssef played a total of 325 matches for Zamalek in both the league and the cup.

National Team
Youssef played for Egypt national football team 97 international matches. Youssef was among the Egyptian squad that participated in 1990 FIFA World Cup. He played all of Egypt's matches. Youssef also participated in three African Nation Cups; 1992, 1994 and 1996.

Coaching career
Former Assistant manager of Egyptian national youth team under 20 years
Qualified for World Cup & Won African Cup of nations

Ismail Youssef coached El Gouna from 2007 till 2010. Ismail joined El Gouna FC after the sacking of Ramadan El Sayed following a disastrous run in the early stages of the competition.

He was hired as the head coach of Itesalat after leaving El Gouna in 2010 but resigned 10 months later to join the technical staff of his former club Zamalek SC as the assistant coach to Egyptian coaching legend Hassan Shehata.

He was hired as the assistant coach of Zamalek SC with Hassan Shehata, and he took command for only one match against TP Mazembe when Zamalek SC lose by 2 goals, he return to his position as assistant coach with the new manager Jorvan Vieira, leave the club after two matches when the season is finished.

Honors

As a Player
Zamalek 
13 Titles for Zamalek as a player

Egyptian Premier League [4]: 1983-84, 1987–88, 1991–92, 1992-93.
Egypt Cup [1]: 1987-88.
African Cup of Champions Clubs [4]: 1984, 1986, 1993, 1996.
CAF Super Cup [2]: 1994, 1997.
Afro-Asian Club Championship [2]: 1987, 1997.

As a Coach
Egypt

African Youth Cup of Nations Champion 2003
As assistant manager of Egyptian youth team he qualified for World Cup under 20 years
As assistant manager of Egyptian youth team he qualified for African Nation Cup under 20 years

References

External links

1964 births
Living people
Egyptian footballers
Egypt international footballers
Zamalek SC players
1990 FIFA World Cup players
1988 African Cup of Nations players
1992 African Cup of Nations players
1994 African Cup of Nations players
1996 African Cup of Nations players
Egyptian football managers
Zamalek SC managers
Egyptian Premier League players
Association football midfielders